A referendum on becoming an overseas territory was held in Wallis and Futuna on 27 December 1959. The proposal was approved by 94.37% of voters. Every voter on Wallis voted in favour, whilst all but three of the votes against the proposal were cast in the Futuna Islands. (There were expatriates who voted while in New Caledonia and the New Hebrides.)

The islands were and have continued to be part of France. At the time, they were a French protectorate. A year and a half after the referendum — on 29 July 1961, the islands officially became an overseas territory.
They have since changed status again, becoming an overseas collectivity in 2003.

Results

References

1959 in Wallis and Futuna
1959 referendums
Referendums in Wallis and Futuna
December 1959 events in Oceania
Autonomy referendums